The 2018–19 is Luceafărul Oradea's 13th season in the Romanian football league system, and their 5th season in the Liga II. Luceferii started the season with an almost entire new squad formed by only 11 players from the old one and a lot of young players. Cristian Lupuț was confirmed as the manager of the team for this season.

Season overview

Background

Previous season positions

First-team squad 

Last updated on 10 March 2019

Transfers and loans

Transfers in

Transfers out

Loans out

Pre-season and friendlies

Competitions

Overview

Liga II

The Liga II fixture list was announced on 19 July 2018.

League table

Results summary

Position by round

Matches

Cupa României

Statistics

Appearances and goals

|-
|16
|LW
|Vasile Pop
|34
|15
|1
|1
|35
|16
|-
|9
|CF
|Daniel Paraschiv
|33
|14
|1
|0
|34
|14
|-
|8
|LM
|Alexandru Dulca
|32
|9
|2
|1
|34
|10
|-
|5
|CB
|Cristian Oroș
|33
|1
|1
|0
|34
|1
|-
|7
|RM
|Paul Mitrică
|30
|1
|1
|0
|31
|1
|-
|20
|CM
|Vlad Prejmerean
|31
|0
|0
|0
|31
|0
|-
|95
|GK
|Bogdan Moga
|29
|0
|1
|0
|30
|0
|-
|13
|CF
|Andrei Ludușan
|27
|4
|1
|1
|28
|5
|-
|23
|CB
|Alexandru Băican
|27
|0
|1
|0
|28
|0
|-
|6
|CM
|Gabriel Preoteasa
|24
|3
|1
|0
|25
|3
|-
|21
|LB
|Kevin Moihedja
|22
|0
|1
|0
|23
|0
|-
|10
|CM
|Paul Chiorean
|18
|0
|2
|0
|20
|0
|-
|11
|LW
|Constantin Roșu
|17
|0
|1
|0
|18
|0
|-
|–
|AM
|Claudiu Codoban
|15
|4
|2
|0
|17
|4
|-
|–
|RW
|Răzvan Gunie
|15
|0
|2
|0
|17
|0
|-
|2
|CB
|Vlad Opriș
|15
|1
|2
|0
|17
|1
|-
|15
|CB
|François Yabré
|15
|1
|0
|0
|15
|1
|-
|19
|CF
|Bertrand Bebey
|13
|2
|0
|0
|13
|2
|-
|14
|RB
|Adrian Ciul
|13
|0
|0
|0
|13
|0
|-
|–
|CF
|Cătălin Țîră
|10
|1
|2
|1
|12
|2
|-
|18
|CM
|Lü Yuefeng
|12
|0
|0
|0
|12
|0
|-
|–
|RB
|Cătălin Toriște
|7
|0
|0
|0
|7
|0
|-
|24
|CM
|Pavel Nemeș
|6
|1
|0
|0
|6
|1
|-
|–
|CF
|Sergiu Pop
|5
|0
|1
|0
|6
|0
|-
|1
|GK
|Ionuț Rus
|6
|0
|0
|0
|6
|0
|-
|4
|RB
|Alan Wanya
|6
|0
|0
|0
|6
|0
|-
|17
|AM
|Patrick Peter
|4
|0
|1
|1
|5
|1
|-
|–
|LB
|Ionuț Ban
|5
|0
|0
|0
|5
|0
|-
|22
|RB
|Flavius Drăgan
|4
|0
|1
|0
|5
|0
|-
|–
|CB
|Andrei Tânc
|5
|0
|0
|0
|5
|0
|-
|–
|CM
|Darius Lukács
|4
|0
|0
|0
|4
|0
|-
|12
|GK
|Sebastian Moroz
|3
|0
|1
|0
|4
|0
|-
|3
|CB
|Alexandru Core
|2
|0
|1
|0
|3
|0
|-
|–
|CB
|Ionuț Gruia
|2
|0
|1
|0
|3
|0
|-
|26
|CF
|Daniel Lăsconi
|3
|0
|0
|0
|3
|0
|-
|25
|CM
|Tudor Călin
|2
|0
|0
|0
|2
|0
|-
|–
|GK
|Alin Goia
|1
|0
|0
|0
|1
|0
|-
|–
|CM
|Paul Chiș-Toie
|0
|0
|0
|0
|0
|0
|-
|–
|CM
|Narcis Cîrlig 
|0
|0
|0
|0
|0
|0
|-
|–
|CM
|Hery Kim
|0
|0
|0
|0
|0
|0
|}

Squad statistics
{|class="wikitable" style="text-align: center;"
|-
! 
! style="width:70px;"|Liga II
! style="width:70px;"|Cupa României
! style="width:70px;"|Home
! style="width:70px;"|Away
! style="width:70px;"|Total Stats
|-
|align=left|Games played       || 38 ||  2 || 20 || 20 || 40 
|-
|align=left|Games won          || 14 ||  1 || 11 ||  4 || 15 
|-
|align=left|Games drawn        || 10 ||  0 ||  5 ||  5 || 10
|-
|align=left|Games lost         || 14 ||  1 ||  4 || 11 || 15 
|-
|align=left|Goals scored       || 57 ||  5 || 42 || 20 || 62 
|-
|align=left|Goals conceded     || 59 ||  6 || 21 || 44 || 65
|-
|align=left|Goal difference    || -2 || -1 ||+21 ||-24 || -3 
|-
|align=left|Clean sheets       || 14 ||  0 || 10 ||  4 || 14
|-
|align=left|Goal by Substitute ||  7 ||  2 ||  5 ||  4 ||  9
|-
|align=left|Players used       || 37 ||  0 ||  – ||  – || 37
|-
|align=left|Yellow cards       ||101 ||  2 || 56 || 47 || 103
|-
|align=left|Red cards          ||  6 ||  0 ||  3 ||  3 ||  6
|-
|align=left| Winning rate      || 36.84% || 50.00% || 55.00% || 20.00% || 37.50% 
|-

Goalscorers

Goal minutes

Last updated:1 June 2019 (UTC) 
Source: Soccerway

Hat-tricks

Clean sheets

Disciplinary record

Attendances

See also

 2018–19 Liga II
 2018–19 Cupa României

References

CS Luceafărul Oradea seasons
Luceafărul, Oradea, CS